Club Sport Huancayo is a Peruvian football club based in Huancayo, Junín. The club play in the Peruvian Primera División since 2009, having gained promotion after winning the 2008 Copa Perú.

History

Founding 
On February 7, 2007, Huancaína Sport Club was founded by the initiative of a beer company led by Raúl Rojas and Édgar Araníbar, which purchased the playing rights of Club Escuela de Fútbol Huancayo, who was at that time playing in the Liga Distrital de El Tambo. In 2008, the club changed its name to Sport Huancayo to better identify themselves with the city of Huancayo.

Copa Perú 
In the 2008 Copa Perú, the club qualified to the 2009 Torneo Descentralizado as Copa Perú champion, when defeated Atlético Torino, Colegio Nacional Iquitos, and Cobresol in the Copa Perú's Final Stage.

Professional era 
In the 2009 Torneo Descentralizado, the club was fourth place and classified to the 2010 Copa Sudamericana, with the big coach Cristóbal Cubilla.

In the 2010 Copa Sudamericana, the club was eliminated by Defensor Sporting in the Second Stage.

In the 2011 Torneo Descentralizado, the club finished in third place and classified to its first Copa Libertadores for the 2012 season.

In the 2012 Copa Libertadores, the club was eliminated by Arsenal de Sarandí in the First Stage. In the Peruvian tournament the club finished in sixth position, in this way, they managed to qualify for the 2013 Copa Sudamericana. In 2014, the club was saved from relegation after beating Caimanes 1-0.

In 2016, the coach Diego Umaña took charge of the team. In the Copa Sudamericana the club was eliminated in the second round, after losing to Sol de America. In 2018, they eliminated Unión Española in the first stage of the Copa Sudamericana, then they were eliminated by Caracas FC.

Honours

National

League
Torneo Apertura:
Runner-up (2): 2020 Fase 1, 2022

Torneo de Verano: 
Runner-up (1): 2018

Copa Perú:
Winners (1): 2008

National cups
 Copa Bicentenario:
Runner-up (1): 2019

Regional
Región V:
Runner-up (1): 2008

Liga Departamental de Junín:
Runner-up (1): 2008

Liga Provincial de Huancayo:
Winners (1): 2008

Liga Distrital de El Tambo:
Winners (2): 2007, 2008

Under-20 team
Torneo de Promoción y Reserva: 
Winners (1): 2017
Runner-up (1): 2019

Performance in CONMEBOL competitions

A = appearances, P = matches played, W = won, D = drawn, L = lost, GF = goals for, GA = goals against, DG = difference goals, Pts = points.

Copa Libertadores

Copa Sudamericana

U-20 Copa Libertadores

Records

Year-by-year 

This is a partial list of the last five seasons completed by Sport Huancayo. For the full season-by-season history, see List of Sport Huancayo seasons.

Top goalscorers

International competitions

Players

Current squad

Former players

Managers
Below is a list of Sport Huancayo managers from 2009, the club's first season in the Peruvian first division, until the present day.

Notes

References

External links
 Sitio web oficial
 Sport Huancayo en Cuestiones de la Polis

Football clubs in Peru
Association football clubs established in 2008
Sport Huancayo